The position of President of the Maine Senate was created when Maine separated from Massachusetts and achieved statehood in 1820.

The Maine Legislature had one year terms until 1880, when an amendment to the Maine Constitution took effect to provide for two year terms. Joseph A. Locke was the first Senate president to serve a two-year term, starting in 1881.

As Maine has no lieutenant governor, the president of the Senate is first in line to become Governor of Maine in the event of a vacancy.

List of presidents of the Maine Senate

References

Presidents of the Maine Senate